"Gee, Officer Krupke" is a comedy number from the 1957 musical West Side Story. The song was composed by Stephen Sondheim (lyrics) and Leonard Bernstein (music), and was featured in the Broadway musical and subsequent 1961 and 2021 films.

Music
The song is sung by members of the street gang the Jets, who poke fun at the gruff Police Sergeant Krupke by singing about the societal forces that led them to join a gang. Following a theme used throughout the musical, the song begins with a tritone on the word Dear, held longer to signify its importance. Lyrically, the song features four seven-line verses, each filled with puns and wordplay. Each verse culminates with an interjection (e.g., "Golly Moses", "Leapin' lizards"), followed by the final line.

The tune was originally composed for an unused song for the Venice scene in Candide, where the lyrics, by John Latouche, ended with the line, "Where does it get you in the end?"

Censorship
The last line of the song (performed as a "Shave and a Haircut" fanfare) is "Gee, Officer Krupke – Krup you!" Lyricist Stephen Sondheim originally wanted to break a then-existing Broadway taboo by ending the song with "Gee, Officer Krupke – fuck you!", but Columbia Records, which owned the rights to the cast album, told Sondheim that the album could then not be shipped to other states without violating the obscenity laws of the era. Accordingly, Sondheim changed the ending of the song to "Krup you", and later told an interviewer that the new line was the best lyric in the whole musical.

Other versions

Stage play vs. 1961 film
In the original Broadway version, the song appears in the second act, but in the 1961 film version the song was moved to Act One, performed by the Jets (with Riff singing lead) prior to their imminent rumble with the Sharks. For the film's release, "Krupke" was switched with "Cool" (which was originally performed in the play's first act) on a request from Sondheim, who disliked the sequence of the songs in the play, feeling it was unfitting to watch a street gang perform a comedy number right after having seen both gang leaders get killed in the rumble.

Additionally, two stanzas in the film version had their lyrics censored:

Stage play vs. 2021 film
In the 2021 film version, the song (using the lyrics from the 1957 Broadway version, with the exception of a section using the 1961 film's lyrics) is again moved to the first half, performed prior to the rumble, with "Cool" moved to after "One Hand, One Heart". Additionally, instead of in the streets, the song takes place in the 21st Precinct of the New York City Police Department.

In popular culture
The eighth episode of season seven of Curb Your Enthusiasm is entitled "Officer Krupke". The episode features a police officer whose name is Krupke, and has Larry David describe the controversy over the name. At one point, David is singing the finale of the song and is overheard by others, who think he has said "Fuck you". "Gee, Officer Krupke" was also used as the end credits song in that episode.

In the second episode of season 4 of The Marvelous Mrs. Maisel, Midge (Rachel Brosnahan) describes a police officer who arrested her based on a misunderstanding as "Officer fucking Krupke".

References

Songs about crime
Songs about police officers
Songs about fictional male characters
Songs about teenagers
Songs about parenthood
Songs from West Side Story
Songs with music by Leonard Bernstein
1957 songs
Songs written by Stephen Sondheim